Rogiera amoena (syn. Rondeletia amoena) is a shrub or small tree in the family Rubiaceae, sometimes grown as an ornamental plant. Common names include rondeletia and yellowthroat rondeletia. The species is native to Mexico, Belize, Guatemala, El Salvador, Nicaragua, Costa Rica and Panama.

French botanist Jules Émile Planchon described Rogiera amoena in 1849.<ref name="planchon1849">{{cite journal| authorlink = Jules Émile Planchon |author=Planchon, Jules Émile |year= 1849 |title= Flore des Serres et des Jardins de l'Europe |volume=5 |page= 442 |url=http://www.botanicus.org/page/1364456}}</ref> It is the type species of the genus Rogiera. It was transferred to the genus Rondeletia in 1879 by William Hemsley in 1879.

The spring flowers of Rogiera amoena'' give it horticultural potential. It readily adapts to cultivation, growing in sun or part shade. Watering during dry periods is beneficial. It can be propagated by seed or semi-hardwood cuttings.

References

Guettardeae
Flora of Belize
Flora of Costa Rica
Flora of El Salvador
Flora of Guatemala
Flora of Mexico
Flora of Panama